John Thomas Jost (born 1968) is a social psychologist best known for his work on system justification theory and the psychology of political ideology. Jost received his AB degree in Psychology and Human Development from Duke University (1989), where he studied with Irving E. Alexander, Philip R. Costanzo, David Goldstein, and Lynn Hasher, and his PhD in Social and Political Psychology from Yale University (1995), where he was the last doctoral student of Leonard Doob and William J. McGuire. He was also a student of Mahzarin R. Banaji and a postdoctoral trainee of Arie W. Kruglanski.

Jost has contributed extensively to the study of stereotyping, prejudice, intergroup relations, social justice, and political psychology. In collaboration with Mahzarin R. Banaji, he proposed a theory of system justification processes in 1994, and in collaboration with Jack Glaser, Arie Kruglanski, and Frank Sulloway he proposed a theory of political ideology as motivated social cognition in 2003. Since 2003, he has been on the faculty of New York University, where he is Professor of Psychology and Politics (Affiliated Appointment). Jost is a member of numerous editorial boards and professional organizations and societies, and he was President of the International Society of Political Psychology from 2015 to 2016. He is the Editor of a book series on Political Psychology for Oxford University Press (https://global.oup.com/academic/content/series/s/series-in-political-psychology-sppsy/?lang=en&cc=us). Jost received honorary doctorates from the University of Buenos Aires in Argentina in 2018 and the Eötvös Lorand University (ELTE) in Budapest, Hungary in 2021. He delivered the Aaron Wildavsky  Lecture in the Goldman School of Public Policy at UC Berkeley in 2022 (https://www.youtube.com/watch?v=vb2UHmoSQaQ&t=1s).

Jost's writings have been translated into several languages, including Spanish, Italian, French, Portuguese, German, Hungarian, Polish, and Japanese.

Awards 
Jost's awards include the following:

2022- Juliette and Alexander L. George Outstanding Political Psychology Book Award Sponsored by the International Society of Political Psychology, for Left & Right: The Psychological Significance of a Political Distinction (https://ispp.org/awards/george/)
2019 - Carol and Ed Diener Award to Recognize a Mid-Career Scholar Whose Work Has Added Substantially to the Body of Knowledge in Social Psychology, Sponsored by the Society for Personality and Social Psychology and the Foundation for Personality and Social Psychology (https://spsp.org/membership/awards/midcareer/diener-award-social-psychology)
2018 - Honoris Causa, University of Buenos Aires, Argentina
2017-2018 - G. Stanley Hall Award, Society for the Teaching of Psychology, American Psychological Association
2017 - “Top Psychology Professors on Twitter,” OnlineEducation.com (https://www.onlineeducation.com/features/connected-psychology-professors-on-twitter)
2015 - “Top ten article of the year on digital news and social media” (http://www.niemanlab.org/2015/12/investigating-the-network-the-top-10-articles-from-the-year-in-digital-news-and-social-media-research/)
2011 - Fellow, Society for Personality and Social Psychology
 2010 – Society of Experimental Social Psychology: Career Trajectory Award
 2007 - International Center for Cooperation and Conflict Resolution, Columbia University: Morton Deutsch Award for Distinguished Scholarly and Practical Contributions to Social Justice
 2005 - International Society for Self and Identity: Outstanding Early Career Award
 2004 – International Society of Political Psychology: Erik Erikson Early Career Award
 2003 - Society for Personality and Social Psychology: Theoretical Innovation Award
 1993, 2006, 2007 - Society for the Psychological Study of Social Issues: Gordon Allport Award

Books 

Jost, J.T. (2021). Left & right: The psychological significance of a political distinction. New York: Oxford University Press. https://global.oup.com/academic/product/left-and-right-9780190858339?cc=us&lang=en&
Jost, J.T. (2020). A theory of system justification. Cambridge, MA: Harvard University Press. https://www.hup.harvard.edu/catalog.php?isbn=9780674244658
Jost, J.T., Kay, A.C., & Thorisdottir, H. (Eds.) (2009). Social and psychological bases of ideology and system justification. New York: Oxford University Press. http://www.oup.com/us/catalog/general/subject/Psychology/Social/?view=usa&ci=9780195320916
Jost, J.T., Banaji, M.R., & Prentice, D. (Eds.) (2004). Perspectivism in social psychology: The yin and yang of scientific progress. [Festschrift in honor of William J. McGuire.]   Washington, DC: APA Press. http://www.apa.org/books/4316009.html  
Jost, J.T., & Sidanius, J. (Eds.) (2004). Political psychology: Key readings. New York: Psychology Press/Taylor & Francis. https://web.archive.org/web/20050824200204/http://www.keyreadings.com/social/book.asp?ID=1841690694  
Jost, J.T., & Major, B. (Eds.) (2001). The psychology of legitimacy: Emerging perspectives on ideology, justice, and intergroup relations. New York: Cambridge University Press. https://web.archive.org/web/20071013040830/http://cup.org/titles/catalogue.asp?isbn=0521786991

Major Articles 

Jost, J.T., & Banaji, M.R. (1994). The role of stereotyping in system-justification and the production of false consciousness. British Journal of Social Psychology, 33, 1-27.
Jost, J.T., & Thompson, E.P. (2000). Group-based dominance and opposition to equality as independent predictors of self-esteem, ethnocentrism, and social policy attitudes among African Americans and European Americans. Journal of Experimental Social Psychology, 36, 209-232.  
Jost, J.T., & Kruglanski, A.W. (2002). The estrangement of social constructionism and experimental social psychology: History of the rift and prospects for reconciliation. Personality and Social Psychology Review, 6, 168-187. 
Jost, J.T., Glaser, J., Kruglanski, A.W., & Sulloway, F. (2003). Political conservatism as motivated social cognition. Psychological Bulletin, 129, 339-375. 
Jost, J.T., & Hunyady, O. (2003). The psychology of system justification and the palliative function of ideology. European Review of Social Psychology, 13, 111-153.
Kay, A.C., & Jost, J.T. (2003). Complementary justice: Effects of “poor but happy” and “poor but honest” stereotype exemplars on system justification and implicit activation of the justice motive. Journal of Personality and Social Psychology, 85, 823-837. 
Jost, J.T., Banaji, M.R., & Nosek, B.A. (2004). A decade of system justification theory: Accumulated evidence of conscious and unconscious bolstering of the status quo. Political Psychology, 25, 881-919.
Jost, J.T., & Hunyady, O. (2005). Antecedents and consequences of system-justifying ideologies. Current Directions in Psychological Science, 14, 260-265. 
Jost, J.T., & Kay, A.C. (2005). Exposure to benevolent sexism and complementary gender stereotypes: Consequences for specific and diffuse forms of system justification. Journal of Personality and Social Psychology, 88, 498-509. 
Jost, J.T. (2006). The end of the end of ideology. American Psychologist, 61, 651-670.
Amodio, D.M., Jost, J.T., Master, S.L., & Yee, C.M. (2007). Neurocognitive correlates of liberalism and conservatism. Nature Neuroscience, 10, 1246-1247. 
Carney, D.R., Jost, J.T., Gosling, S.D., & Potter, J. (2008). The secret lives of liberals and conservatives: Personality profiles, interaction styles, and the things they leave behind. Political Psychology, 29, 807-840. 
Jost, J.T., Nosek, B.A., & Gosling, S.D. (2008). Ideology: Its resurgence in social, personality, and political psychology. Perspectives on Psychological Science, 3, 126-136. 
Napier, J.L., & Jost, J.T. (2008). Why are conservatives happier than liberals?  Psychological Science, 19, 565-572.
Jost, J.T., Federico, C.M., & Napier, J. L. (2009). Political ideology: Its structure, functions, and elective affinities. Annual Review of Psychology, 60, 307-337.
Jost, J.T., & Kay, A.C. (2010). Social justice: History, theory, and research. In S.T. Fiske, D. Gilbert, & G. Lindzey (Eds.), Handbook of social psychology (5th edition, Vol. 2, pp. 1122-1165). Hoboken, NJ: Wiley.
Jost, J.T., & van der Toorn, J. (2012). System justification theory. In P.A.M. van Lange, A. W. Kruglanski, & E. T. Higgins (Eds.), Handbook of theories of social psychology (Vol. 2, pp. 313-343). London: Sage.
Jost, J.T., Nam, H., Amodio, D., & Van Bavel, J.J. (2014). Political neuroscience: The beginning of a beautiful friendship. Advances in Political Psychology (Vol. 35, Supplement 1, pp. 3-42). 
Barberá, P., Jost, J.T., Nagler, J., Tucker, J.A., & Bonneau, R. (2015). Tweeting from left to right: Is online political communication more than an echo chamber? Psychological Science, 26, 1531-1542.
Jost, J.T. (2015). Resistance to change: A social psychological perspective. Social Research: An International Quarterly, 82, 607-636.
Hennes, E.P., Ruisch, B., Feygina, I., Monteiro, C., & Jost, J.T. (2016). Motivated recall in the service of the economic system: The case of anthropogenic climate change. Journal of Experimental Psychology: General, 145, 755–771.
Jost, J.T. (2017). Ideological asymmetries and the essence of political psychology. Political Psychology, 38, 167-208.
Nam, H.H., Jost, J.T., Kaggen, L., Campbell-Meiklejohn, D., & Van Bavel, J.J. (2018). Amygdala structure and the tendency to regard the social system as legitimate and desirable. Nature Human Behaviour, 2, 133-138
Jost, J.T. (2019a). A quarter century of system justification theory: Questions, answers, criticisms, and societal applications. British Journal of Social Psychology, 58, 263-314. 
Jost, J.T. (2019b). The IAT is dead, long live the IAT: Context-sensitive measures of implicit attitudes are indispensable to social and political psychology. Current Directions in Psychological Science, 28, 10-19.
Badaan, V., & Jost, J.T. (2020). Conceptual, empirical, and practical problems with the claim that intolerance, prejudice, and discrimination are equivalent on the political left and right. Current Opinion in Behavioral Sciences, 34, 229-238. https://doi.org/10.1016/j.cobeha.2020.07.007 
Goudarzi, S., Pliskin, R., Jost, J.T., & Knowles, E. (2020). Economic system justification predicts muted emotional responses to inequality. Nature Communications, 11, 383 (2020). https://doi.org/10.1038/s41467-019-14193-z  
Sterling, J., Jost, J.T., & Bonneau, R. (2020). Political psycholinguistics: A comprehensive analysis of the language habits of liberal and conservative social media users. Journal of Personality and Social Psychology, 118, 805–834.
Krosch, A.R., Jost, J.T., & Van Bavel, J.J. (2021). The neural basis of ideological differences in race categorization. Philosophical Transactions of the Royal Society B: Biological Sciences, 376, 20200139. https://doi.org/10.1098/rstb.2020.0139 
Nam, H.H., Jost, J.T., Meager, M., & Van Bavel, J.J. (2021). Toward a neuropsychology of political orientation: Exploring ideology in patients with frontal and midbrain lesions. Philosophical Transactions of the Royal Society B: Biological Sciences, 376, 200200137. https://doi.org/10.1098/rstb.2020.0137 
van der Linden, S., Panagopoulos, C., Azevedo, F., & Jost, J.T. (2021). The paranoid style in American politics revisited: An ideological asymmetry in conspiratorial thinking. Political Psychology, 42, 23-51. https://doi.org/10.1111/pops.12681 
Jost, J.T., Baldassarri, D., & Druckman, J. (2022). Cognitive-motivational mechanisms of political polarization in social-communicative contexts. Nature Reviews Psychology, 1, 560–576. https://doi.org/10.1038/s44159-022-00093-5

References

External links 

Social Media and Political Participation
Profile at Social Psychology Network

Living people
1968 births
American social psychologists
Duke University alumni
Yale University alumni
New York University faculty
American political psychologists
University of Cincinnati alumni